The 1st Armoured Division is a division of the Syrian Arab Army. It was established before 1973.

Yom Kippur War 
During the Syrian Army's assault on the Israeli held Golan Heights during the 1973 Yom Kippur War, the 1st Division was held in reserve until a breakthrough was made on the front line. On the evening of the first day of battle, 6 October, the division was sent forward to follow the success of the 5th Division in the southern part of the line. Dunstan writes that on the evening of the next day, the division commander, Colonel Tewfiq Juhni, had established a supply and administrative complex in the Khishniyah area. During the next two days, elements of the division fought along the Syrian salient in the southern Golan, taking part in the battles around Nafach, Khishniyah and the area around Al-‘Al. On 10 October, along with other elements of the Syrian Army, the last remnants of the division finally withdrew after hard fighting against the Israeli defenders.

1982 Lebanon War 
At the outbreak of the Lebanon War, the entire division was stationed in the Bekaa Valley. At the time, it was composed of the 91st Armoured Brigade, the 76th Armoured Brigade and the 58th Mechanized Brigade. Each armoured brigade contained about 160 tanks, and the mechanized brigade consisted of about 40, which added up to a division total of about 360 tanks (usually T-62s).
In addition to these units, the 20th Commando Regiment was under the command of the division. It which was primarily used in the anti-tank role. The first clash between Syrian forces and the Israeli army forces occurred near the town of Jezzine, in the southern part of the valley. To protect the town against the advancing Israeli forces, infantry units and elements of the 76th Armoured Brigade were dispatched. In the ensuing battle, the IDF managed to defeat the Syrian forces and occupy the town.

A few days later, the division again fought forces of the IDF, who attacked the division on 11 June 1982, in the Battle of Sultan Yacoub. During this battle, the 91st and 76th Brigades were in the line while the 58th remained in reserve. At the same time forces of the 3rd Armoured Division began moving south along the Bekaa Valley to help against the Israeli attack. Finally, after heavy fighting, the division successfully staved off the Israeli troops and continued to hold the eastern part of the Beirut - Damascus line. Despite the losses the Syrians suffered, this battle is considered a great success because the Israeli effort was curbed.

21st century 
The division was subordinate to the Second Corps, whose headquarters are in Al-Zabadani, north-west of Damascus, on the border of Lebanon. The corps has responsibility for the entire area north of Damascus to Homs including Lebanon. Corps forces were set up in Lebanon during the Syrian presence there, which lasted from 1976 to 2005. The 1st Division itself is currently headquartered at the Al-Kiswah base, south of Damascus.

In 2001, according to Richard Bennett, the division was composed of three brigades, the 44th Armoured, 46th Armoured, and the 42nd Mechanized.

According to Holliday, by the beginning of 2012, the division consisted of the 76th, 91st, and 153rd Armoured Brigades, the 58th Mechanized Brigade, and an artillery regiment. Between February and April 2012, the 76th Armoured Brigade '..conducted a series of violent clearance operations in rural Idlib Governorate, during which its soldiers committed numerous atrocities across a swath of Syrian villages and left behind graffiti proclaiming the work of the "Death Brigade".

According to Gregory Waters, circa 2017-18 the division consists of the 57th, 58th, 61st, 68th, 91st and 171st Brigades, plus artillery and smaller units, with only the 58th and 91st Brigades dating from before 2011.

The division's brigades (57th, 76th, 91st tank and 58th mechanized) lost between 40%-65% of their heavy equipment (e.g. tanks and armoured vehicles). In mid-2018 reports indicated that the division is being reorganized and rebuilt under Russian supervision.

References

External links 
 http://www.francesoir.fr/en-coop-matteo-puxton/la-brigade-de-la-mort-assad-la-1ere-division-blindee-de-armee-syrienne

Armoured divisions of Syria
Military units and formations established in the 1970s
Armoured Division 1